is a Japanese short-track speed-skater.

Ozawa competed at the 2006 and 2010 Winter Olympics for Japan. In 2006, she finished second in the opening round of the 1000 metres, then second in her quarterfinal, advancing to the semifinals, where she placed fifth, to end up ninth overall. She was also a member of the Japanese 3000 metre relay team, which finished fourth in the semifinals and fourth in the B Final, ending up seventh overall.

In 2010, she was disqualified in her round one race of the 1500 metres, failing to advance. In the 1000 metres, she finished second in the opening round, then fourth in the quarterfinals, failing to advance. She again participated in the 3000 metre relay team, which finished third in the semifinals and fourth in the B Final, ending up seventh overall.

As of 2013, Ozawa's best performance at the World Championships is fourth, as a member of the Japanese relay team in 2005. Her best individual result is 11th, in the 2003 1500 metres. She also won a silver medal at the 2005 World Short Track Speed Skating Team Championships for Japan, and a bronze medal at the World Junior Championships.

As of 2013, Ozawa has six ISU Short Track Speed Skating World Cup podium finishes, all as part of the Japanese relay team. Her best finish is a pair of silver medals.  She finished eighth in the World Cup rankings in the 1500 metres in two seasons.

World Cup Podiums

References

External links 
 

1985 births
Living people
Japanese female short track speed skaters
Olympic short track speed skaters of Japan
Short track speed skaters at the 2006 Winter Olympics
Short track speed skaters at the 2010 Winter Olympics
Asian Games bronze medalists for Japan
Asian Games medalists in short track speed skating
Short track speed skaters at the 2003 Asian Winter Games
Medalists at the 2003 Asian Winter Games
Sportspeople from Nagano Prefecture